The Ministry of Labor (MOL) is a ministry of the Republic of China (Taiwan) representing opinions of employees, political and academic circles to review labor policies, laws and regulations, as well as related projects and programs in Taiwan. MOL is working with various international organizations and bilateral exchanges for elevating the welfare of labors in ROC, such as the Labor Insurance program.

History

In 1947, before the implement of Constitution of the Republic of China, the Nationalist government planned to establish the Ministry of Labor under Executive Yuan. May 18, 1948, the Ministry of Social is founded by Executive Yuan, labor affairs was downgrade to an agency under Ministry of Social. March 21, 1949, the Ministry of Social was abolished, labor affairs was minister by Department of Interior Affairs, by the newly founded Division of Labor, Department of Interior Affairs.

The ministry was independent established as the Council of Labor Affairs (CLA) on 1 August 1987. The council was upgraded to Ministry of Labor Affairs on 17 February 2014.

July 1999, Taiwan Province government was downsized, the Council of Labor Affairs labor take over the original duties from Department of Labor Affairs, Taiwan Provincial Government, and established the Central Office, Council of Labor Affairs, Executive Yuan. January 1, 2013, Council of Labor take over youngsters employment duties from National Youth Commission (Youth Employment Training Center). 2014, Central Office, Council of Labor Affairs reorganized into Skill Evaluation Center of Work Force Agency, Ministry of Labor.

The Taiwanese government had planned to upgrade labor affairs to ministry level. In 1990, the government of Lee Teng-hui amended the Organizational Act of the Executive Yuan. February 2009, government of Ma Ying-jeou amended the Organizational Act of the Executive Yuan, and make sure the Council of Labor will be upgraded to Ministry of Labor Affairs, sending the amended act to the Legislative Yuan.

January 29, 2014, Legislative Yuan pass the third reading of Organization Act of the Ministry of Labor, The Bureau of Labor Insurance, Ministry of Labor Organization Act, Organic Act of Workforce Development Agency, Ministry of Labor, Organization Act for the Bureau of Labor Funds of the Ministry of Labor, Organization Law of Occupational Safety and Health Administration, Ministry of Labor, Organic Act of Institute of Labor, Occupational Safety and Health, Ministry of Labor. February 17, Council of Labor Affairs, Executive Yuan is upgrade to "Ministry of Labor", still rent the part of the office spaces in Empire Garden Plaza for the ministry's administrative units. The another agencies like Occupational Safety and Health Administration, Workforce Development Agency are located in the Xinzhuang Joint Office Tower.

Lease space to own office space 

From the start of Ministry of Labor it is an independent government agency, it doesn't has its own office space and needs to rent space from third party. During the time of 2001 to March 2018, the Council of Labor Affairs rent the office space in Empire Garden Plaza on No. 83, Section 2, Yanping North Road, Datong District, Taipei City.

June 2017, Ministry of Labor decided they will move to the "Building of Taiwan Cooperative Bank, Taiwan Province" (the old headquarter of Taiwan Cooperative Bank, No. 77, Guanqian Road, Zhongzheng District, Taipei City.). May 14, 2018, the headquarter of Ministry of Labor officially moved into the 4 to 14 levels of the Building of Taiwan Cooperative Bank, Taiwan Province and started office hours. But the Ministry of Labor still wanted to seek its own office spaces.

June 1, 2020, the Ministry of Labor confirmed they got their own office space. Veterans Affairs Commission published a press release, it said that after the dismiss of their own company RSEA Engineering Corporation, the company's office space in the 9 to 13 floor of Chi Ching Building, Songjian Road, Zhongzheng District, Taipei City, will be sold to Ministry of Labor in 2021. Ministry of Labor plan to move into Chi Ching Building 2023, and will no longer prepare budget for rent lease.

Visions
 Autonomy
 Equality
 Development

Organization structures

Administrative Units
 Department of General Planning
 Department of Employment Relations
 Department of Labor Insurance 
 Department of Employment Welfare and Retirement
 Department of Labor Standards and Equal Employment
 Department of Legal Services

Staff Units
 Department of General Affairs
 Department of Human Resources
 Department of Civil Service Ethics
 Department of Accounting
 Department of Statistics
 Department of Information Management

Agencies
 
 
 
 Taipei-Keelung-Hualien-Kinmen-Matsu Regional Office
 
 
 
 Kaohsiung-Pingtung-Penghu-Taitung Regional Office

List of ministers

Political Party:

Access
The MOL headquarters is accessible within walking distance from NTU Hospital metro station or Taipei Main Station of the Taipei Metro.

See also
 Executive Yuan

References

External links 

 Ministry of Labor, Taiwan

Executive Yuan
Taiwan
Labour
Taiwan, Labour
1987 establishments in Taiwan